Arkit (Ərkit) is a rural locality (a selo) and the administrative centre of Arkitsky Selsoviet, Tabasaransky District, Republic of Dagestan, Russia. The population was 608 as of 2010.

Geography 
Arkit is located 11 km east of Khuchni (the district's administrative centre) by road. Rishchul is the nearest rural locality.

References 

Rural localities in Tabasaransky District